Eikos, Inc is a technology company based in Franklin, Massachusetts that is developing transparent, electrically conductive carbon nanotube films and nanotube inks for transparent conductive coatings. Eikos has branded its technology as Invisicon. It was founded in 1996 by Joseph Piche.

Eikos is aiming to replace indium tin oxide (ITO) and conducting polymers with carbon nanotube transparent conductors in several common electronic devices, such as touch screens, LCDs, OLEDs, photovoltaics, electroluminescent lamps, electronic paper. Nanotube films have several advantages over ITO, which make them attractive in these markets. For example, nanotube films are exceptionally flexible and can be deposited using low cost, atmospheric coating methods.

Eikos' coatings have been recognized by R&D Magazine with a R&D 100 Award in 2005 for environmentally friendly coatings and the Micro/Nano 25 in 2006. Eikos also was awarded a Technology Innovation Award for Materials and other Base Technologies by The Wall Street Journal in September, 2006.

References

External links
 Eikos Website

Companies based in Massachusetts
Chemical companies of the United States
Nanotechnology institutions
Electronics companies of the United States
Nanotechnology companies
Companies established in 1996